A modern English grammar on historical principles is a seven-volume grammar of English written by Otto Jespersen. The first volume, Sounds and Spellings, was published in 1909; volumes two through five were on syntax; volume six was on morphology; and volume seven returned to the topic of syntax. It took until 1949 for these subsequent volumes to be completed.

References 

English grammar books